Oran is an unincorporated community in Palo Pinto County, Texas, United States.

Public education in the community is provided by the Graford Independent School District.

References

Unincorporated communities in Palo Pinto County, Texas
Unincorporated communities in Texas